Naja'atu Bala Muhammad (born 1956) is a Nigerian politician. Her father Alh Ali Abdullahi, a socialist an immediate with Aminu Kano. She is Action Congress of Nigeria (ACN) Nominee for Kano Central District Senator in 2007 Nigerian General Election She is also one of the first women to have served as president of the National Students Union Nigeria in the prestigious Ahmadu Bello University, Zaria (ABU) and also the first female Vice - President of the National Association of Nigerian Students (NANS).

She claimed to have brought President of Nigeria, Muhammadu Buhari, into politics.

Early life and education
Muhammad was born in 1956, in the Central City of Kano into the family of Alhaji Ali Abdullahi, who happens to be a core socialist and one of Mallam Aminu Kano's contemporaries in the Northern Elements Progressive Union (NEPU). Muhammad attended primary school at St. Louis Private School, Kano, and went to WTC Secondary School in Kano. She obtained a bachelor's degree in history from Ahmadu Bello University, Zaria.

Personal
Muhammad is the widow of Dr Bala Muhammed, a political adviser to Second Republic Governor Abubakar Rimi. Her husband was murdered during the administration of Abubakar Rimi. In her words she stated how the incident occurred

"My husband, late Bala Muhammad was chopped into pieces and burnt alive for his opposition and what he was saying"  Between 1982 and 1983 by a mob that caused a rampage after the Governor Abubakar Rimi. issued the Emir of Kano, Ado Bayero a query.

Achievements 
Despite the fact that women's participation in politics is underrepresented, Naja'atu Bala Muhammad gave it a new dimension by being one of the foremost social figures and political activist and also known as the voice of the people of kano As a nominee and a member of the committee responsible for fostering reconciliations between the Boko Haram Sect anNigerian Government. Naja'atu Bala Muhammad sees it as a window to nation-building and peace enhancement in the nation. She was asked whether she'll withdraw from the committee, she said 'I vowed not to ever pull out of the committee, and as a Muslim and by the permission of Allah, i will try my best in carrying ouy my duties'.

Dr. Naja'atu Bala held the position of director Civil Society Liaison in the All Progressives Congress APC Presidential Campaign Council PCC, and was also given the position of a Commissioner at the Police Service Commission PSC in 2018 .

Political career 
Muhammad, the Director Civil Society Liaison in the APC, PCC currently resigned from her office which she wrote to the National Chairman Abdullahi Adamu as well as her membership in the party, due to some reasons she mentioned. She said the her values and that of the party no longer go in line.

In the letter she stated that “The challenges that Nigeria faces today require me to continue championing the struggle for a better country with a clear conscience as I remain absolutely loyal to Nigeria”, she noted.

References

Living people
1956 births
Nigerian women in politics
Politicians from Kano State
Politicians from Kano
People from Kano State
Nigerian Muslims
Activists
Political activists